Ctenodactylomorphi is an infraorder of the rodent suborder Hystricomorpha that includes two living families, the Ctenodactylidae (gundis) and the Diatomyidae (Laotian rock rat).

References

Mammal infraorders
Rodent taxonomy